Powdrell is a surname. Notable people with the surname include:

 Jane Powdrell-Culbert (born 1949), American politician
 Ryan Powdrell (born 1983), American footballer
 Walter Powdrell (1872–1921), New Zealand politician

See also
 Powell (surname)